John Feilder was an English politician who sat as a royal independent during the Rump Parliament, where he has been described as "one of the most conservative influences". 

After attending Oxford University he joined the army, becoming a colonel and captain of foot, and captain of a troop of horse during the English Civil War, when he was initially commander of Farnham Castle and thereafter commanded the forces of Surrey. In 1649 he briefly served as Governor of Portsmouth .

He entered politics after marrying the sister of Sir John Trevor, a fellow Cornish MP. He was High Sheriff of Hampshire for 1642 and then returned as Member of Parliament for St Ives, Cornwall for 1647–1653 and again in 1659. 

The family lived at Horkesley Hall, in Essex, and Heyshott Manor, in West Sussex.

References 

Politicians from Cornwall
High Sheriffs of Hampshire
Members of the pre-1707 English Parliament for constituencies in Cornwall
Alumni of the University of Oxford
Year of birth missing
People from St Ives, Cornwall
People from the Borough of Colchester
Year of death missing
English MPs 1648–1653
17th-century English politicians